Ectoedemia molybditis is a moth of the  family Nepticulidae. It was described by Zeller in 1877. It is known from Colombia.

References

Nepticulidae
Moths of South America
Moths described in 1877